Aston (Old English: East farm or settlement) is a village and civil parish in the High Peak district of Derbyshire, England, located in the Peak District near Hope. According to the 2001 census it had a population of 100, increasing to 155 and including Ashopton in the Census 2011.

See also 
Listed buildings in Aston, High Peak
Yorkshire Bridge

References

External links
 
 

Villages in Derbyshire
Towns and villages of the Peak District
Civil parishes in Derbyshire
High Peak, Derbyshire